Members of the New South Wales Legislative Assembly who served in the ninth parliament of New South Wales held their seats from 1877 to 1880. The 1877 election was held between 24 October and 12 November 1877 with parliament first meeting on 27 November 1877. There were 73 members elected for 53 single member electorates, 6 two member electorates and 2 four member electorates. Premiers during this parliament were Sir John Robertson until 18 December 1877, James Farnell from 18 December 1877 until 21 December 1878 and Sir Henry Parkes from 21 December 1878. The Speaker was Sir George Allen.

See also
Fourth Robertson ministry
Farnell ministry
Third Parkes ministry
Results of the 1877 New South Wales colonial election
Candidates of the 1877 New South Wales colonial election

Notes
There was no party system in New South Wales politics until 1887. Under the constitution, ministers were required to resign to recontest their seats in a by-election when appointed. These by-elections are only noted when the minister was defeated; in general, he was elected unopposed.

References

 

Members of New South Wales parliaments by term
19th-century Australian politicians